Kearney High School is a public high school in Kearney, Nebraska, United States. It is part of the Kearney Public Schools district. It is one of two high schools in Kearney (the other being Kearney Catholic High School).

Buildings
The original school was built in 1879 and was named Whittier School. It was used for grades K-12 until a new high school, Longfellow High School, was built in 1890. This was used until 1960 when the new high school was ready, and was later demolished. The school experienced several major additions. The original 1960 building featured an auditorium, band room, shared vocal/chorus room, cafeteria, offices, gym, library, and a lowered garden atrium. Since then, major additions included the vocational wing in 1981, the 400 Hallway in 1988, and the "Commons", 600 Hallway and North Gym in 1995.

In September 2013, Kearney voters approved a $75 million bond to build a new Kearney High School, in southwest Kearney; the building is located at 3610 6th Avenue. Its west side borders the campus of Horizon Middle School. The new building is a third larger than its predecessor. Construction was finished in the fall of 2016. The old building was put up for auction, and the winning bid came from First Baptist Church of Kearney. The bid was $260,000.

Sports

State championships

Notable alumni
 Drew Anderson, professional baseball player
 Jon Bokenkamp, writer and producer
 Leslie Easterbrook, actress; best known for her role as Debbie Callahan in the Police Academy series
 Alva R. Fitch, lieutenant general in the United States Army
 Kyle Larson, professional football player
 Brett Maher, professional football player
 Peter George Peterson, United States Secretary of Commerce 1972–73; senior chairman of Blackstone Group
 Charlie Tuna, Los Angeles radio and TV personality

References

External links
 Official school website
 Kearney Public Schools

Public high schools in Nebraska
Schools in Buffalo County, Nebraska
Buildings and structures in Kearney, Nebraska